Thomas Frank (born 9 October 1973) is a Danish professional football coach and former amateur player, who is head coach of  club Brentford.

After 18 years in youth coaching, which included spells as manager of multiple Danish national youth teams, Frank became a senior manager with Brøndby IF in 2013. After his departure in 2016, he moved to English club Brentford as assistant head coach and was promoted into the role of head coach in October 2018. At the end of the 2020–21 season, Frank became only the second Brentford head coach or manager to achieve promotion to the top-flight of English football.

Managerial career

Denmark 
After a short playing career in amateur football as a midfielder, Frank began his coaching career with the U8 and U12 teams at Frederiksværk BK. He moved on to Hvidovre IF in 1998, B93 in 2005 and Lyngby in 2006. In July 2008, Frank was appointed manager of the Denmark national U16 and U17 teams. In 2011, he led the U17 team to the European U17 Championship finals for the first time in eight years (advancing to the semi-finals before losing 2–0 to Germany) and to its first U17 World Cup, in which the team was eliminated in the group stage. Frank was promoted to the Denmark U19 manager's job in July 2012, but he failed to qualify for the 2013 European U19 Championship. During his time working for the DBU, Frank also acted as manager during an unofficial U18 match in 2010 and presided over one U20 match in 2012, covering for Morten Wieghorst. He also served as assistant for the U18, U17, U16 and women's U17 teams on an ad-hoc basis.

Brøndby IF 
Frank was named as manager of Danish Superliga club Brøndby IF on 10 June 2013, his first position in senior football. He achieved 4th- and 3rd-place finishes respectively in the 2013–14 and 2014–15 seasons, high enough to qualify for the Europa League qualification stages, but failed to lead the club into the group stage in either season. Frank resigned on 9 March 2016 after receiving criticism from chairman Jan Bech Andersen, under a pseudonym, on an online supporters' forum.

Brentford

Assistant role and appointment as head coach (2016–2019) 
On 9 December 2016, Frank moved to England to join Championship club Brentford as assistant head coach alongside Richard O'Kelly. He signed a -year contract. In addition to being a "bridge between the players and the coaching staff", co-director of football Rasmus Ankersen revealed that Frank would also "look after the players between the B team and the first team and make sure there is a pathway for them and take care of their development". In February 2018, he signed a new contract, which would run until the end of the 2019–20 season.

On 16 October 2018, after the departure of head coach Dean Smith, it was announced that Frank had been promoted into the role. He took over a club rocked by the recent death of technical director Robert Rowan and endured a tough start to his tenure, winning just one of his first 10 games, before stabilising the team's form after a change to a 3–4–3 formation. Seven points from a possible nine in January 2019 saw him nominated for the Championship Manager of the Month award. He guided Brentford to the fifth round of the FA Cup and an 11th-place finish in the Championship at the end of the 2018–19 season.

Promotion to the Premier League (2019–2021) 
After an uneven start to the 2019–20 season and switching back to a 4–3–3 formation, 10 points from five matches in October 2019 saw Frank nominated for the Championship Manager of the Month award. With Brentford in the play-off places, Frank and his assistant Brian Riemer signed new -year contracts in January 2020. After the season restart, an unbeaten June won Frank the Championship Manager of the Month award and he oversaw Brentford's run to the 2020 Championship play-off Final, which Brentford lost 2–1 to West London rivals Fulham.

Frank reached 100 matches as Brentford manager in late October 2020; at the time he had the highest winning percentage of any Brentford manager with a tenure of 100 matches or more. In the midst of a 21-match unbeaten run in league matches, five wins in December 2020 won Frank the Championship Manager of the Month award. Following a run to the club's first ever appearance in the semi-finals of the EFL Cup, Frank managed Brentford to a second-successive third-place Championship finish during the 2020–21 regular season. The team went one better than the previous season during the play-offs, winning promotion to the Premier League after a 2–0 victory over Swansea City in the 2021 Championship play-off Final. The promotion made him the second Brentford head coach to win promotion to the top-tier, after Harry Curtis won the Second Division championship in 1934–35. During the 2020–21 season, Frank was named the 2020 DBU Coach of the Year and was nominated for the 2021 London Football Awards Manager of the Year award.

Premier League (2021–present) 
Halfway through the 2021–22 season – with Brentford placed 14th in the Premier League table, 9 points clear of the relegation zone – Frank and his assistant Brian Riemer signed -year contract extensions on 21 January 2022. In March 2022, Frank was nominated for a second successive DBU Coach of the Year award. An unbeaten April 2022 saw Frank nominated for the Premier League Manager of the Month award and the following month, he was nominated for the Premier League Manager of the Season award. He oversaw a final Premier League placing of 13th. In October 2022, Frank achieved the feat of having won more of his first 200 matches than any Brentford head coach or manager to also reach 200. Frank's assistant Brian Riemer left his role on 2 December 2022 and was replaced three days later by Claus Nørgaard, who had previously worked as Frank's assistant at the DBU and Brøndby IF. On Christmas Eve 2022, Frank signed a new -year contract. Unbeaten form around the turn of the year saw Frank nominated for the November/December 2022 and January 2023 Premier League Manager of the Month awards.

Personal life 
Frank was awarded a BA in Physical Education by the Copenhagen Institute of Sports Medicine in 1999 and studied sport psychology and coaching-based leadership at the same institution between 2002 and 2005. He also worked at a kindergarten and later taught at Ishøj Business College in 2004. Prior to moving to London in December 2016, Frank lived in Hvidovre. He is married and has three children and has a dog named Torben.

Managerial statistics

Honours 
Denmark U17
 Syrenka Cup: 2010

Brentford
 EFL Championship play-offs: 2021

Individual
 London Football Awards Manager of the Year: 2020
DBU Coach of the Year: 2020
 EFL Championship Manager of the Month: June 2020, December 2020

References

External links 
 
 Thomas Frank at brentfordfc.com
 Thomas Frank at dbu.dk

1973 births
Living people
People from Frederiksværk
Danish men's footballers
Association football midfielders
Danish football managers
Brøndby IF managers
Brentford F.C. managers
Danish expatriate football managers
Danish expatriate sportspeople in England
Expatriate football managers in England
English Football League managers
Association football coaches
Danish Superliga managers
Premier League managers
Sportspeople from the Capital Region of Denmark